Lilaceophlebia is a genus of three species of crust fungi in the family Meruliaceae. The genus was first proposed by Erast Parmasto in 1968 as a section of the genus Phlebia. Viacheslav Spirin and Ivan Zmitrovich elevated the taxon to generic status in 2004.

Species
Lilaceophlebia georgica (Parmasto) Spirin & Zmitr. (2004)
Lilaceophlebia ochraceofulva (Bourdot & Galzin) Spirin & Zmitr. (2004)
Lilaceophlebia tremelloidea (Bres.) Zmitr. (2015)

References

Taxa described in 1968
Meruliaceae
Polyporales genera